Franco Calderón (born 13 May 1998) is an Argentine professional footballer who plays as a centre-back for Unión Santa Fe.

Career
Calderón's senior career began with Unión Santa Fe. He previously had youth stints with Charata Juniors and Cooperativista. Leonardo Madelón moved the defender into the first-team set-up in 2018–19, subsequently selecting Calderón to start a Copa de la Superliga first round, first leg at the Estadio La Ciudadela on 13 April 2019; he appeared for the full duration of a 1–1 draw. By the conclusion of 2019–20, Calderón had made thirteen appearances in all competitions for Unión; a period in which he scored his first goal, netting in a Copa Argentina first round defeat to Primera C Metropolitana's Dock Sud.

Personal life
Calderón's twin brother, Pablo, is also a professional footballer.

Career statistics
.

References

External links

1998 births
Living people
Sportspeople from Chaco Province
Argentine footballers
Association football defenders
Argentine Primera División players
Unión de Santa Fe footballers